KIKU (channel 20) is a multicultural independent television station in Honolulu, Hawaii, United States, serving the Hawaiian Islands. It is owned by Allen Media Group alongside ABC affiliate KITV (channel 4). The two stations share studios on South King Street in downtown Honolulu; KIKU's transmitter is located in Nānākuli.

History

Prior history of the KIKU callsign in Honolulu
Although the station advertises on-air that it has been on the air for "over 40 years," the "current KIKU" is not to be confused with another station in Honolulu on VHF channel 13 that formerly used the KIKU call letters. That station launched as independent station KTRG-TV on July 4, 1962, under the ownership of the Watumull Broadcasting Company. That station was sold in 1966, changing its call letters to KIKU. The original KIKU became quite popular with Hawaiian children throughout the 1970s, televising several Japanese tokusatsu shows, including Kamen Rider V3, Kikaider, Rainbowman, Ganbare!! Robocon, Himitsu Sentai Gorenger and Battle Fever J.

The Cushmans of San Diego, in partnership with TV Asahi and ten local investors, formed Mid-Pacific Television Associates and purchased channel 13 on April 9, 1979. Japanese programming was pared down and moved to the prime time hours from 7 to 10 p.m.; KIKU switched to a "kid vid" format, scoring success with programs such as The Children's Hour and Professor Fun. (the Japanese programs would be dropped completely by 1981).

In 1984, KIKU had its callsign changed to KHNL-TV. In 1986, KHNL-TV was sold to Seattle-based King Broadcasting Company; that year, channel 13 became a charter affiliate of the Fox network. However, KHNL continued to broadcast Asian programming content—mostly sumo wrestling matches. In 1992, King Broadcasting merged with the Providence Journal Company and its financial partner, Kelso & Company. KHNL presently operates as the market's NBC affiliate following a January 1, 1996, affiliation switch that saw the station trade network affiliations with KHON-TV (channel 2), which became Honolulu's Fox affiliate on that date through a groupwide affiliation agreement with its then-owner SF Broadcasting.

KIKU station history
Channel 20's history traces back to February 12, 1980, when a license for the allocation was filed with the Federal Communications Commission (FCC), officially registered under the call letters KHAI-TV. It signed on the air under that callsign on December 30, 1983, under the ownership of Chattanooga, Tennessee-based Media Central. Initially, the station's programming mirrored that of a traditional independent station during the daytime and late evening hours (featuring cartoons such as Inspector Gadget and Voltron, Defender of the Universe, infomercials, and movie packages such as Kung Fu Theater), with most of the Asian programming airing in the evenings, similar to the format of the channel 13 KIKU. This would gradually change over the years as it expanded the Asian programming throughout its entire schedule. KHAI was originally carried by Oceanic Cable on channel 21, C-SPAN took over the space during the morning hours when KHAI was off-the-air; this continued until Oceanic realigned its basic cable lineup and move the station to channel 9. After Media Central ran into financial troubles and filed for Chapter 11 bankruptcy, KHAI was sold to the owners of Los Angeles multicultural station KSCI in 1989. The station changed its call letters to KIKU on September 4, 1993.

In October 2003, the station's general manager Gregg Mueller left KIKU after a three-year tenure. After many years, acting president Joanne Ninomiya of JN Productions ended her company's partnership with KIKU in early 2004.

On November 1, 2004, KIKU began a secondary affiliation with UPN. The station became the fourth and final television station in the Honolulu market to affiliate with UPN; KFVE served as the market's original UPN affiliate from January 1995 to September 2002, after which KHON-TV and KGMB shared the network's programming as a joint secondary affiliation until October 2004. KIKU aired most UPN programming during the late afternoon hours, with some shows airing out of pattern. For instance, in 2006, the station aired UPN's Thursday night comedy block out of order on Friday afternoons, resulting in WWE Friday Night Smackdown airing in a Saturday late night timeslot.

KIKU reverted to being a full-time independent station after UPN shut down on September 17, 2006 (UPN and The WB's consolidation and shutdowns that month resulted in the creation of The CW Television Network). After the launch of The CW was announced, KIKU formally announced it would not seek to affiliate with the upstart network; The CW later signed an affiliation deal with KHON-TV, which carries the network on a digital subchannel.

On September 18, 2006, KIKU became one of the few over-the-air affiliates of the Funimation Channel. From that date until September 2007, KIKU ran two hours of select anime programs in English every weekday from 6:00 to 7:00 and 10:00 to 11:00 p.m., with the lineup of shows changing periodically. KIKU disaffiliated from the FUNimation Channel in September 2007, due to low viewership.

In January 2012, KIKU's then-owner AsianMedia Group filed for Chapter 11 bankruptcy protection; the station, along with KSCI in Los Angeles and its San Diego repeater KUAN-LP, was sold to NRJ TV (a company unrelated to European broadcaster NRJ Radio) for $45 million in March 2012, in a transaction that included the assumption of AsianMedia Group's debt. In May 2012, KIKU dropped most of its English-language entertainment programming to concentrate on expanding its Asian programming.

Sale to WRNN-TV Associates
On December 9, 2019, it was announced that WRNN-TV Associates, owner of New York City–based WRNN-TV, secured a deal to purchase seven full-power TV stations (including KIKU and KSCI) and one Class A station from NRJ. The sale was approved by the FCC on January 23, and was completed on February 4, 2020.

In May 2021, the station announced that it would cease its current programming and begin airing ShopHQ on June 28, 2021, a programming direction noted with disapproval by the station's longtime general manager, Phyllis Kihara, announcing the move. This change was part of a larger and controversial deal that RNN made for main-channel affiliations for ShopHQ, whose stations, no matter their content, are required to be carried by pay TV providers under must-carry guidelines. ShopHQ itself was, and is, universally available on cable and satellite throughout the United States, including Oceanic Spectrum channel 24 on the Islands. This made the requirement to carry the network on KIKU from disconnected ownership in suburban New York especially troublesome to viewers seeing a Mainland owner force a programming change upon the station without any local input.

Sale to Allen Media Group
On September 27, 2021, it was announced that KIKU would be sold to Allen Media Broadcasting for $4,000,000. The sale was completed on January 31, 2022.

Programming
Prior to the switch to ShopHQ, most of KIKU's programming consisted of multicultural content catering to the large Asian community in the Hawaiian Islands. Programs seen on the station were broadcast in Japanese, Filipino, and English. Japanese programming was its most popular genre on the station, with content licensed from some of Japan's major television broadcasters, including TV Asahi, TBS Television, NHK and Nippon TV. KIKU's Filipino programming was from the most popular television broadcasters in the Philippines, including GMA Network, ABS-CBN, and TV5. In 2011, KIKU expanded its Asian focus to include Chinese programming on Saturdays.

KIKU partnered with various companies to provide English subtitles for its Japanese programming to reach English-speaking viewers; some programs were subtitled in-house.

On May 30, 2021, it was announced that KIKU would stop airing Filipino and Japanese TV content after June 28, 2021, and instead become an affiliate of ShopHQ (which previously aired on its second subchannel).

On January 31, 2022, KIKU returned to airing Japanese and Filipino programming, as well as local news from its now-sister station KITV. It also added Entertainment Studios and other syndicated content to fill the schedule out further.

Criticism
In the April 2006 hardcopy publication Kokiku Magazine, fans have expressed their displeasure of KIKU continuing to air old travel shows such as Soko ga Shiritai. In the following May issue, KIKU general manager Phyllis Kihara defended the station's position, stating that Soko ranks higher in the local Nielsen ratings than some of the major network shows that air in the 7:00 p.m. timeslot on weeknights.

Technical information

Subchannels
The station's digital signal is multiplexed:

Analog-to-digital conversion
KIKU discontinued regular programming on its analog signal, over UHF channel 20, on January 15, 2009, the date in which full-power television stations in Hawaii transitioned from analog to digital broadcasts (six months earlier than the June 12 transition date for stations on the U.S. mainland). The station's digital signal remained on its pre-transition UHF channel 19, using PSIP to display the station's virtual channel as its former UHF analog channel 20.

See also
Nippon Golden Network
TV Japan

References

External links

Independent television stations in the United States
Laff (TV network) affiliates
Television channels and stations established in 1983
IKU
Japanese-language television stations
1983 establishments in Hawaii
Entertainment Studios